Thiago dos Santos (born 2 October 1990), known as Thiago Santos, is a Brazilian footballer who plays as a forward.

Career statistics

References

External links

1990 births
Living people
Brazilian footballers
Lagarto Futebol Clube players
Al-Ittihad Kalba SC players
Paraná Clube players
Association football forwards
Campeonato Brasileiro Série B players
Campeonato Brasileiro Série D players
Club Sportivo Sergipe players
Clube Atlético Bragantino players
Sampaio Corrêa Futebol Clube players
Clube Atlético Linense players
Brazilian expatriate footballers
Expatriate footballers in the United Arab Emirates
Brazilian expatriate sportspeople in the United Arab Emirates
UAE First Division League players
People from Aracaju
Sportspeople from Sergipe